Utheemu is one of the inhabited islands of  Haa Alif Atoll administrative division and geographically part of Thiladhummathi Atoll in the north of the Maldives.  It is an island-level administrative constituency governed by the Utheemu Island Council.

History
Utheemu is famed as the birthplace of  Sultan Mohamed Thakurufaanu, who with his brothers and his companions fought an eight-year-long war to drive out the Portuguese invaders who occupied the Maldives from 1558 to 1573. Utheemu Ganduvaru is the wooden palace in which Sultan Mohamed Thakurufaanu lived and grew up. It is well preserved and evokes more than any other existing building in the Maldives, the lifestyle of the rich, centuries ago. 

The kings of the Utheemu Dynasty, Sultans Muhammed Imaduddin I (1632 to 1648 AD), Ibrahim Iskandar I (1648 to 1687 AD), Kuda Muhammad (1687 to 1691 AD) and Mohammed Moheyeddin (1691 to 1692 AD) all descended from this island. Regents from Utheem also ruled the Maldives from 1573 to 1632 AD, but the legal (though unrecognised) kings of the islands during this period were the exiled Christian Kings of the Maldives residing in Goa, India.

From 1602 to 1607, a French sailor, François Pyrard de Laval spent time on the Maldives, and gave a detailed account of the customs of the islanders during the Utheemu dynasty. His three-volume work was published in 1619 and is considered a valuable historical archive.

Geography

Demography

Gallery

References

External links
Isles: Utheemu

Islands of the Maldives